Monsieur Klein is a 1976 mystery drama film directed by Joseph Losey, produced by and starring Alain Delon in the title role. Set in Vichy France, the Kafkaesque narrative follows an apparently Gentile Parisian art dealer who is seemingly mistaken for a Jewish man of the same name and targeted in the Holocaust, unable to prove his identity.

The film is a French and Italian co-production, and premiered at the 1976 Cannes Film Festival. It received widespread acclaim from critics and won three César Awards; Best Film, Best Director (Joseph Losey), and Best Production Design (Alexandre Trauner). Alain Delon was nominated for Best Actor.

Plot
Paris, January 1942. France is occupied by the Nazis. Robert Klein, apparently apolitical and amoral, is a well-to-do art dealer, Roman Catholic and Alsatian by birth, who takes advantage of French Jews who need to sell artworks to raise cash to leave the country.

One day, the local Jewish newspaper, addressed to him, is delivered to his home. He learns that another Robert Klein who has been living in Paris, a Jew sought by police, has had his own mail forwarded to him in an apparent attempt to destroy his social reputation and make him a target of official anti-Semitism. He reports this to the police, who remain suspicious he may be reporting this scheme to disguise his own true identity.

His own investigations lead him in contradictory directions, to Klein who lives in a slum while having an affair with his concierge and to Klein who visits a palatial country estate where he has seduced an apparently Jewish married woman.

When the art dealer cannot locate the other Klein, authorities require him to offer proof of his French non-Jewish ancestry. While waiting for the documentation to arrive, he struggles to track down his namesake and learn his motivation. Before he can resolve the situation by either means, he is caught up in the July 1942 roundup of Parisian Jews.

The film offers no clear resolution of its contradictory evidence and blind alleys. It ends as he is reunited with Jews who once were his clients as they board boxcars for Auschwitz.

Cast

Symbolism and allusions
Although Losey integrates historical elements (such as the infamous Vel' d'Hiv Roundup) into the film, it is more than a reconstruction of the life and status of the Jews under the Vichy regime.

The relationship of the film with the works of the writer Franz Kafka has often been noted, for example: The Metamorphosis, telling of the brutal and sudden transformation of a man into an insect; The Castle, which describes a search for one's own identity by way of getting to know "the other"; The Trial, which sees an accused man become an outlaw of society.

According to Vincent Canby, the filmmakers "are not as interested in the workings of the plot as in matters of identity and obsession".

Reception
The film has an approval rating of 100% on Rotten Tomatoes based on 16 reviews.

Vincent Canby of The New York Times who saw the film at the 68th Street Playhouse in 1977, had criticized the role of Alain Delon as Mr. Klein, saying that [he] is neither interesting nor mysterious enough to hold a film together.

Awards and nominations
The film was nominated for the Palme d'Or at the 1976 Cannes Film Festival but lost to Taxi Driver. However, Monsieur Klein did win the César Award for Best Film while Losey won the César Award for Best Director. Alexandre Trauner won the César Award for Best Production Design, Alain Delon was nominated for the César Award for Best Actor, and in addition the film was nominated for Césars in three other categories.

Restoration 
A restored version was released by Rialto Pictures in 2019.

References

External links

Mr. Klein, an article by Christopher Weedman, at Senses of Cinema.
What Cornelius Gurlitt Could Have Learned from Monsieur Robert Klein, an article by Karen Loew, at Forward.

1976 films
Best Film César Award winners
César Award winners
Films about identity theft
Films directed by Joseph Losey
Films produced by Alain Delon
Films whose director won the Best Director César Award
Holocaust films
The Holocaust in France
French mystery drama films
French historical drama films
French psychological drama films
Italian mystery drama films
Italian historical drama films
Italian psychological drama films
French World War II films
Italian World War II films
1970s French-language films
1970s Italian films
1970s French films